Revati is a rāgam in Carnatic music (musical scale of South Indian classical music). It is an audava rāgam (or owdava rāgam, meaning pentatonic scale). It is a janya rāgam (derived scale), as it does not have all the seven swaras (musical notes).

In Hindustani music a raga that closely resembles Revati is Bairagi Bhairav. It is said to evoke Karuṇa rasa (pathos). This scale has also been used in chanting Vedas.

Structure and Lakshana
Revati is a symmetric rāgam that does not contain gāndhāram or dhaivatam. It is a pentatonic scale (audava-audava ragam in Carnatic music classification – audava meaning 'of 5'). Its  structure (ascending and descending scale) is as follows (see swaras in Carnatic music for details on below notation and terms):

 : 
 : 
(notes used in this scale are shuddha rishabham, shuddha madhyamam, panchamam, kaisiki nishadham)

Revati is considered a janya rāgam of Ratnangi, the 2nd Melakarta rāgam, though it can be derived from other melakarta rāgams, Vanaspati, Hanumatodi, Natakapriya, Vakulabharanam or Chakravakam, by dropping both gāndhāram and dhaivatam.

Popular compositions
Revati rāgam lends itself for elaboration and exploration and has many compositions. Here are some popular kritis composed in Revati.

Jagannatha anatharakshaka by Subba Rao
Nanati baduku by Annamacharya
Dhavalagangeya Gangadhara By Vadiraja Tirtha
Parvati Bhagavathi By Ganakalabhushana R. K. Padmanabha
Rogaharane krupasagara, Siri Ramana, Venkatesha Stavaraja By Jagannatha Dasa
Mahadeva shiva shambho by Thanjavur Sankara Iyer
 Bho shambho shiva shambho svayambho by Swami Dayananda Saraswati
navaratna bhushanalankrte by Kollegal R Subramanian
Vâni Vēna Pâni by Kalyani Varadarajan

Lalgudi Jayaraman has also composed a melodious Thillana in this rāgam.

Film Songs

Language:Tamil

Tamil Devotional Songs

Related rāgams
This section covers the theoretical and scientific aspect of this rāgam.

In Japanese/Western music Revati corresponds to Insen scale

Graha bhedam 
Revati's notes when shifted using Graha bhedam, yields 2 other pentatonic rāgams, namely, Shivaranjani and Sunadavinodini. Graha bhedam is the step taken in keeping the relative note frequencies same, while shifting the shadjam to the next note in the rāgam. See Graha bhedam on Shivaranjani for more details and an illustration.

Scale similarities
Madhyamāvati is a rāgam which has the chathusruthi rishabham in place of the shuddha rishabham. Its  structure is S R2 M1 P N2 S : S N2 P M1 R2 S

Notes

References

Janya ragas